Mersin State Art and Sculpture Museum is a museum in Mersin, Turkey. It is in a neighborhood known for galleries and Art Club of İçel.

The construction date of the building is not known. Probably it was an inn for the villagers in the early days of Mersin. There were stables in the ground floor. Later it was converted to a hotel and was purchased by a family from Gülnar ilçe (district) . They named the hotel Gülnar Oteli ("Hotel Gülnar"). During the age of modern hotels, Hotel Gülnar was closed and was left alone for about twenty years. 
With the support of İstemihan Talay , the minister of Culture between 1997-1999, the building was acquired by the government.  Following a restoration project, in 2002, it was opened as a state art and sculpture museum. The ground floor is the gallery and the upper floor is reserved for the office and the meeting room.

The construction material of the two storey building is cut stone. Corbels were made by lath and plaster method.

References

Buildings and structures in Mersin
Art museums and galleries  in Turkey
2002 establishments in Turkey
State Art and Sculpture
Museums established in 2002